Pita Godinet (born 21 December 1987) is a Samoa international rugby league footballer who plays as a  for the Dapto Canaries in the Illawarra Rugby League.

Background
Godinet was born in Christchurch, New Zealand.

Early years
Godinet is a Sydenham and Richmond Rovers junior.

Playing career
Godinet played for the Waitakere Rangers in the 2007 Bartercard Cup.

In 2008 he represented Auckland in the Bartercard Premiership, and played for the Auckland Vulcans in the NSW Cup. He was named the Vulcans rookie of the year.

Te Atatu Roosters
In 2010 Godinet signed with the Te Atatu Roosters in the Auckland Rugby League competition. In 2010 he represented Auckland in the Albert Baskerville Trophy, and played for the Auckland Vulcans in the NSW Cup. He was selected at halfback in the NSW Cup team of the year.

New Zealand Warriors
In October 2010 Godinet was signed by the New Zealand Warriors to take part in their 2010-2011 pre-season training. This was updated to a full-time contract in February 2011. He was also part of the Manurewa Marlins in 2011. He has re-signed with the Warriors until the end of 2013.

Godinet was named to make his National Rugby League début on 24 July 2011, replacing an injured Lance Hohaia. Godinet had a "dream debut", scoring a try in his first match.

Manly Sea Eagles
During the 2016 pre-season, Godinet trialled with the Manly Warringah Sea Eagles, and was subsequently signed to a one-year contract.

Godinet featured for the Manly Sea Eagles in the 2017 NRL Auckland Nines, and signed for the Wests Tigers in December 2017.

Atlanta Rhinos
On 11 May 2021 it was reported that he had signed for the Atlanta Rhinos in the North American Rugby League

Representative career
Godinet made his début for Samoa on 16 October 2010, being called into the side to replace the injured Ben Roberts at halfback. Godinet scored the only try for Samoa.

In 2013, Godinet was selected to play for the Samoans in their 2013 Rugby League World Cup campaign. He appeared in all four of the Samoans' games in the Tournament. He scored one try against the French in the group stage.

On 7 October 2014, Godinet was selected in the Samoa national rugby league team 24-man squad for the 2014 Four Nations series.

In 2016 Godinet played for Amerika Samoa in the Cabramatta International Nines tournament. On 7 May 2016, Godinet returned to playing for Samoa, playing in the 2016 Polynesian Cup against Tonga where he played as the halfback in the 18–6 win at Parramatta Stadium. Later in the year, he was also part of the Samoan team that took on Fiji in a historical test match in Apia.

References

External links
NRL profile
Manly Sea Eagles profile
2017 RLWC profile

 

1987 births
Living people
Auckland rugby league team players
Atlanta Rhinos players
Dapto Canaries players
Featherstone Rovers players
Manly Warringah Sea Eagles players
Manurewa Marlins players
New Zealand sportspeople of Samoan descent
New Zealand rugby league players
New Zealand Warriors players
People educated at St Paul's College, Auckland
Richmond Bulldogs players
Rugby league halfbacks
Rugby league hookers
Rugby league players from Christchurch
Samoa national rugby league team players
Samoan rugby league players
Sydenham Swans players
Te Atatu Roosters players
Villeneuve Leopards players
Waitakere rugby league team players
Wakefield Trinity players
Western Suburbs Magpies NSW Cup players
Wests Tigers players